Syllepte purpuralis is a moth in the family Crambidae. It was described by Francis Walker in 1866. It is found in Colombia.

References

Moths described in 1866
purpuralis
Moths of South America